David P. Hunter (born January 1, 1958) is a Canadian former professional ice hockey player who won three Stanley Cups with the Edmonton Oilers in the 1980s. He also played for the Pittsburgh Penguins and Winnipeg Jets. Hunter was born in Petrolia, Ontario, but grew up in nearby (13 km) Oil Springs, Ontario, and was the first of the three Hunter brothers, which also includes fellow NHLers Dale and Mark to reach the NHL. He was the Montreal Canadiens 2nd first round pick (17th overall) in the 1978 NHL Amateur Draft from the Sudbury Wolves.

Awards and achievements
1983–84 - NHL - Stanley Cup (Edmonton)
1984–85 - NHL - Stanley Cup (Edmonton)
1986–87 - NHL - Stanley Cup (Edmonton)

Career statistics

Regular season and playoffs

International

See also
List of family relations in the National Hockey League

External links
Profile at hockeydraftcentral.com

1958 births
Living people
Edmonton Oilers (WHA) players
Edmonton Oilers players
Ice hockey people from Ontario
Montreal Canadiens draft picks
National Hockey League first-round draft picks
People from Lambton County
Pittsburgh Penguins players
Stanley Cup champions
Sudbury Wolves players
Winnipeg Jets (1979–1996) players
Canadian ice hockey left wingers